Korean shamanism or Mu-ism is a religion from Korea. In the Korean language, alternative terms for the tradition are musok and mugyo. Scholars of religion have classified it as a folk religion. There is no central authority in control of the religion and much diversity exists among practitioners.

The musok religion is polytheistic, promoting belief in a range of deities. Both these deities and ancestral spirits are deemed capable of interacting with living humans and causing them problems. Central to the religion are ritual specialists, the majority of them female, called mudang or mu; in English they have sometimes been called "shamans", although the validity of this is contested. The mudang assist paying clients in determining the cause of misfortune using divination. Mudang also perform longer rituals called kut, in which the gods and ancestral spirits are given offerings of food and drink and entertained with song and dance. These may take place in a private home or in a shrine, the kuttang, often located on a mountain. There are various sub-types of mudang, whose approach is often informed by regional tradition. The largest type are the mansin or kangsin-mu, historically dominant in northern regions, whose rituals involve them being personally possessed by deities or ancestral spirits. Another type is the sesŭp-mu of eastern and southern regions, whose rituals entail spirit mediumship but not possession.

Elements of the musok tradition may derive from prehistory. In Joseon Korea, the Confucian elites suppressed the mudang with taxation and legal restrictions, deeming their rites to be improper. From the late 19th century, modernisers – many of whom were Christian – characterised musok as misin (superstition) and supported its suppression. During the Japanese occupation of the early 20th century, nationalistically-oriented folklorists began promoting the idea that musok represented Korea's ancient religion and a manifestation of its national culture; an idea later heavily promoted by mudang themselves. In the mid-20th century, persecution of mudang continued under the Marxist government of North Korea and through the New Community Movement in South Korea. More positive appraisal of the mudang occurred in South Korea from the late 1970s onward, especially as practitioners were associated with the minjung pro-democracy movement and came to be regarded as a source of Korean cultural identity.

Musok is primarily found in South Korea, where there are around 200,000 mudang, although practitioners are also found abroad. While Korean attitudes to religion have historically been fairly inclusive, allowing for syncretism between musok and Buddhism, the mudang have nevertheless long been marginalised. Disapproval of mudang, often regarded as charlatans, remains widespread in South Korea, especially among Christians. Musok has also influenced some Korean new religions, such as Cheondoism and Jeungsanism.

Definition

The anthropologist Chongho Kim noted that providing a definition of Korean shamanism was "really problematic". He characterised "Korean shamanism" as being a largely "residual" category into which all Korean religious practices that were not Buddhist, Confucian, or Christian were lumped. Scholars like Don Baker have conversely presented Korean shamanism as just one facet of "Korea's folk religion."

Korean shamanism has varyingly been labelled a vernacular religion, a folk religion, a popular religion, and an indigenous religion. It is a non-institutionalized religion, rather than being an organized religion akin to Buddhism or Christianity. It has no doctrine, nor any overarching hierarchy. It is orally transmitted. It displays considerable regional variation, as well as variation according to the choices of individual practitioners. Over time, the tradition has displayed both continuity and change.

One of the terms commonly used to describe this religious tradition is musok ("mu folklore"), coined by the folklorist Yi Nŭnghwa. This term emerged during the Japanese colonial period and was used by the Japanese Governor-General in a judgemental fashion to describe rituals he deemed primitive, although has since become popular with scholars and the Korean population. The Korean studies scholar Antonetta L. Bruno employed the capitalised term Musok as a name for the religion. Other terms that have been applied to it include mugyo, muijŭm, and mu. In Korea, the term misin ("superstition") is sometimes used for this religion, but is also applied to other religious and cultural practices like geomancy. While misin carries negative connotations in Korean culture, the term is sometimes used by mudang to describe what they do.

English language studies of the mudang have repeatedly referred to them as "shamans" and their practices as "Korean shamanism" since the late 19th century. Some Korean sources have rendered this English term as shyamŏnijŭm. Having been introduced into English from the Tungusic languages at the end of the 17th century, the term "shamanism" has never received a commonly agreed definition and has been used in at least four distinct ways in the English language. A common definition uses "shamanism" to describe traditions involving visionary flights to perform ritual tasks in another realm, a practice not found in Korean traditional religion. Many scholars avoid the term "shaman" as a cross-cultural category altogether. While considering the term's applicability to Korean religion, Chongho Kim noted that its use as a blanket term was "often unhelpful", while the anthropologist Liora Sarfati noted its use was "controversial" in the Korean context.
Suk-Jay Yim suggested that the term mu-ism was more appropriate for the Korean religion than "Korean shamanism."

Prior to Christianity's arrival in the 17th and 18th centuries, Korean religion was rarely exclusivist, with many Koreans practising Buddhism, Daoism, Confucianism, and vernacular practices like musok simultaneously. There has been particular syncretism between musok practice and Buddhism. If asked, mudang will often identify as Buddhists, and often worship Buddhist deities, while some Korean Buddhist temples venerate deities traditionally associated with musok. In contemporary South Korea, it remains possible for followers of most major religions (barring Christianity) to involve themselves in musok with little censure from fellow members of their religion. Meanwhile, mudang based in Europe have merged the tradition with New Age elements.

Terms and types of practitioners

A key role in musok is played by individuals whom the anthropologist Kyoim Yun called "ritual specialists who mediate between their clients and the invisible" forces of the supernatural. The most common term for these specialists across Korea is mudang, with Sarfati noting that this term "encompasses a variety of folk religion practitioners" across the peninsula. The term mudang can apply to a man or woman. Male practitioners are also commonly called paksu, although in the Seoul area, male practitioners have sometimes been called sana mudang (male mudang), while another term formerly used was kyŏksa. Although commonly used, the term mudang carries derogatory connotations in Korean culture and thus some practitioners avoid it. Other terms used in its place include musok-in, and the term mu.  The Korean word mu is synonymous of the Chinese word wu 巫, which defines both male and female shamans. Several modern mudang advocacy groups have adopted the term musogin, meaning "people who do mu." These modern advocacy groups have also described supporters  as sindo (believers, 信徒) or musindo (believers in the ways of mu, 巫信徒).

Mudang are often divided into two broad types: the kangsin-mu, or "god-descended" mu, and the sesŭp-mu or "hereditary" mu. The former engage in rituals in which they describe themselves as being possessed by supernatural entities; the latter's rituals involve interaction with these entities but not possession. The former was historically more common in the northern and central parts of the Korean peninsula, the latter in the southern parts below the Han River. The kangsin-mu tradition has since spread and by the early 21st century was dominant across South Korea, with its ritual costumes and paraphernalia being widely adopted. As Sarfati noted, the line between the sesŭp-mu and the kangsin-mu "is blurry", while Yun commented that dividing the mudang into distinct typologies "cannot explain complex reality." The sesŭp-mu are typically presented as inheriting the role in a hereditary fashion, although not all sesŭp-mu do so, while some kangsin-mu continue the role of a family member, as if maintaining a hereditary tradition.

Certain terms are commonly used for the mudang in particular regions. In Jeolla Province, the sesŭp-mu are often referred to as tanggol. On Jeju Island, the sesŭp-mu are typically called simbang; this was first recorded in the 15th century, used for mudang on the Korean mainland, but by the early 19th century was exclusively being used for practitioners on Jeju. The kangsin-mu are often referred to as mansin, a term meaning "ten thousand gods", and which is considered "less derogatory" than mudang.

There are also terms sometimes used for mudang but sometimes restricted instead to other types of Korean ritual specialist.  The term yeongmae, describing a spirit medium, is sometimes used to describe separate practitioners from the mudang but is also widely seen as a synonym. Another term some mudang use to describe themselves is posal (bosal), originally a Korean term for a Buddhist bodhisattva, and which is favored more by female than male practitioners. Conversely, some mudang maintain that the term posal should be reserved for the inspirational diviners who are possessed by child spirits but who do not perform the kut rituals of the mudang.

Beliefs

Deities and ancestral spirits

Musok is polytheistic. Supernatural beings are called kwisin, or sin. The mudang divide these beings into two main groups, the gods and the ancestral spirits, although may use the term sin for all of them. Supernatural beings are seen as volatile; if humans do well by them, they can receive good fortune, but if they offend these entities then they may suffer. Devotees of these deities believe that they can engage, converse, and bargain with them. Each mudang will have their own personal pantheon of deities, one that may differ from the pantheon of a mudang they trained under. This individual pantheon is the chusin, and a mudang may add new deities to it during their career. Some of these will be considered guardian deities, each referred to as a taesin. These deities bestow myŏnggi upon the mudang, enabling the latter to have visions and intuition that allows them to perform their tasks.

The deities are called janggunsin. The pantheon of deities, which has changed over time, is termed sindang, with over 130 musok divinities having been identified. The deities can be divided into those embodying natural or cosmological forces and those who were once human, including monarchs, officials, and generals. Some derive from Daoist or Buddhist traditions, others are unique to Korean vernacular religion. They are deemed capable of manifesting in various material forms, such as through paintings or statues, or as inhabiting specific landscape locations, such as trees, rocks, springs, and stone piles. The anthropologist Laurel Kendall suggested that the relationship that mudang had with these spirit-inhabited sites was akin to animism. The gods appear in human form.

The highest deities are often deemed remote and little interested in human affairs; some of the more powerful deities can make demands from humans without any obligation to reciprocate. Other deities are involved in everyday human concerns and prayed to accordingly. Many of the deities desire food and drink, spend money, and enjoy song and dance, and thus receive these things as offerings. Spirits of the dead are thought to yearn for the activities and pleasures they enjoyed in life; spirits of military generals are for instance believed to like dangerous games. The associations of particular deities can change over time; Hogu Pyŏlsŏng was for instance a goddess of smallpox, but after that disease's eradication in the 20th century retained associations with measles and chickenpox.

Cosmological deities include Ch'ilsŏng, the spirit of the seven stars of the Big Dipper, who is regarded as a merciful Buddhist figure who cares for children. Yŏngdŏng is a goddess of the wind, popular in southern areas including Jeju.
Mountain gods are called sansin, or sometimes sansillyŏng. These are typically depicted as a man with a white beard, blue gown, and accompanying tiger. Spirits of military generals are sinjang, and include historical figures like Ch'oeyŏng, Im Kyŏngŏp, Oh, and Chang. More recent military figures have been adopted as musok deities; around Inchon, various mudang have venerated General Douglas MacArthur as a hero of the Korean War.
Child deities are tongja.

Villages traditionally had Jangseung, timber posts representing two generals that guard the settlement from harmful spirits. Historically, villages would often hold annual festivals to thank their tutelary deities. These would often be seen by local men and reflect Confucian traditions, although sometimes mudang were invited to participate. In Korean society, rapid urbanisation has radically changed how people interact with their local deities.

Korean vernacular beliefs include the existence of many household deities. Keeping these entities happy was traditionally regarded as the role of the housewife, and is achieved through offering them food and drink. These informal rituals do not require the involvement of mudang, who would only be called in for special occasions.
There are various house spirits, one of the most prominent of which is Sŏngju, the House Lord. Pollution caused by births or deaths in the household are believed to result in the House Lord leaving, meaning that he must be encouraged to return through ritual. The House Lord may also require propitiation if expensive goods are brought into the home, as he expects a portion of the expenditure to be devoted to him. The god of heaven was different from every other deity, but he was of a similar personal nature to house deities.The ancestral spirits are called chosang. Tutelary ancestors are termed tangju. The ancestors who may be venerated in musok rituals are broader than the purely patrilineal figures venerated in formal Korean ancestor veneration rites, the chesa. These broader ancestors may for instance include those from a woman's natal family, women who have married out of the family, or family members who have died without offspring. While both the musok rites and the Confucian-derived chesa entail communication with ancestors, only the former involves direct communication with these spirits, allowing the ancestors to convey messages directly to the living. Certain ancestral spirits can also form part of a mudang's personal pantheon.
A personal spiritual guardian is the momju (plural momjusin). The momjusin of male mudang are usually deemed female; those of female mudang are typically male.

Buddhist deities have also been incorporated into shamanism.

 Mythology

Korean shamanic narratives include a number of myths that discuss the origins of shamans or the shamanic religion. These include, the Princess Bari myth, the Gongsim myth, and the Chogong bon-puri myth. Origin myths are often called ponp'uri. These narratives have been extensively collected and studied by Korean scholars. During a kut ritual held for the dead, an epic ballad called the Tale of Princess Pari is often recited.

Princess Bari
The Princess Bari narrative is found in all regions except Jeju. Roughly one hundred versions of the myth have been transcribed by scholars as of 2016, around half of those since 1997. As of 1998, all known versions were sung only during gut rituals held for the deceased. Princess Bari is therefore a goddess closely associated with funeral rites. Bari's exact role varies according to the version, sometimes failing to become a deity at all, but she is usually identified as the patron goddess of shamans, the conductor of the souls of the dead, or the goddess of the Big Dipper.

Despite the large number of versions, most agree upon the basic story. The first major episode shared by almost all versions is the marriage of the king and queen. The queen gives birth to six consecutive daughters who are treated luxuriously. When she is pregnant a seventh time, the queen has an auspicious dream. The royal couple takes this as a sign that she is finally bearing a son and prepares the festivities. Unfortunately, the child is a girl. The disappointed king orders the daughter to be thrown away, dubbing her Bari, from Korean   "to throw away." In some versions, she must be abandoned two or three times because she is protected by animals the first and second times. The girl is then rescued by a figure such as the Buddha (who regrets upon seeing her that he cannot take a woman as his disciple), a mountain god, or a stork.

Once Bari has grown, one or both of her parents fall gravely ill. They learn that the disease can only be cured through medicinal water from the Western Heaven. In the majority of versions, the king and queen ask their six older daughters to go fetch the water, but all of them refuse. Desperate, the king and queen order Princess Bari to be found again. In other versions, the royal couple is told in a dream or a prophecy to find their daughter. In any case, Bari is brought to court. She agrees to go to the Western Heaven and departs, usually wearing the robes of a man.

The details of Bari's quest differ according to the version. In one of the oldest recorded narratives, recited by a shaman from near Seoul in the 1930s, she meets the Buddha after having gone three thousand leagues. Seeing through her disguise and remarking that she is a woman, the Buddha asks if she can truly go another three thousand leagues. When Bari responds that she will keep going even if she is to die, he gives her a silk flower, which turns a vast ocean into land for her to cross. She then liberates hundreds of millions of dead souls who are imprisoned in a towering fortress of thorns and steel.

When Bari finally arrives at the site of the medicinal water, she finds it defended by a supernatural guardian (of varying nature) who also knows that she is a woman, and  obliges her to work for him and bear him sons. Once this is done―she may give birth to as many as twelve sons, depending on the version―she is allowed to return with the medicinal water and the flowers of resurrection. When she returns, she finds that her parents (or parent) have already died and that their funerals are being held. She interrupts the funeral procession, opens the coffin lids, and resurrects her parents with the flowers and cures them with the water. In most versions, the princess then attains divinity.

 Additional information on Myths 
One of the common myths in Korean Shamanism is known as the Myth of Tangun. This myth refers to the belief that God would come from heaven. This would result in the earth and heaven being unified. God and human beings would be unified as well. Korean Shamanism believes that the goddess mother of earth is married to the heavenly God.

Birth and the dead

A common belief in Korean vernacular religion is that spirits of the dead wander the human world before entering the afterlife.
After death, the soul must stand trial in court and pass through gates kept by the Ten Kings. At this court, the dead are judged for their conduct in life. The Ten Gates of Hell are regarded as places of punishment for the wicked, typified by grotesque and gory scenes.

The dead are regarded as being intrinsically dangerous to the living as their touch causes affliction, regardless of whether they mean harm or not. Dead family members with unfulfilled desires, such as grandparents who never saw their grandchildren, a first wife who was replaced by a second wife, and young people who died before they could marry, are all considered especially dangerous.
Meddlesome ghosts are thought to often enter the house on a piece of cloth, clothing, or bright object.

If a person suffers a tragic or untimely death, it is believed that their soul hovers between life and death and can cause misfortune for their family; they thus need to be dealt with through ritual.
Terms for wandering spirits include jabkwi and kaeksa, and mudang are deemed best suited for dealing with them, because they can determine what they want and tell them to go away.

On Jeju Island, since the late 1980s there have been public lamentations of the dead involving simbang to mark those killed in the Jeju uprising of 1948.

Morality and ethics

Korean custom places greater emphasis on the good of the group over the wishes of the individual.
It has taboos and expectations, but no concept equivalent to the Christian notion of sin.

Practices

Central to musok rituals is a reciprocal transaction between humans and supernatural entities. These rituals are typically performance-focused, rather than being rooted in a prescribed liturgy, and can last for up to several days.
Most musok rituals take place secretly and involve few participants, usually only the mudang and the clients who have commissioned them.

Mudang

The mudang are, according to their own beliefs, people who interact with the gods and the ancestors by divining their presence and will, performing small rituals to placate them and gain their favor, and oversee the kut rituals to feast and entertain them. Sarfati defined them as "practitioners of spiritual mediation" between the supernatural and human worlds, and noted that in mediating between worlds they are "liminal figures". According to Sarfati, the mudang communicate with supernatural beings "to decrease suffering and create a more harmonious life". Individual mudang can be regarded as having particular specialities.Mudang operate as free agents, rather than members of an ordained clergy. For them, ritual is an economic activity, often being their full-time job, upon which they depend for their income. Some mudang nevertheless fail to earn a living through this ritual vocation. In modern South Korea, mudang have advertised their services in brochures, fliers, and newspapers, and more recently via the Internet. Yun observed that some "scholar-advocates" of musok took a "nostalgic view" that the mudang were "once purer than they are now," having degenerated under the impact of capitalism and modernisation into displaying a more materialistic and self-interested approach to their practice.

Male mudang often wear female clothing and makeup when performing rituals, reflecting their possession of a female monjusin. Female mudang may show an interest in smoking, drinking alcohol, and playing with bladed weapons, reflecting that they have a male monjusin. In Korean society, there have been persistent rumours about the toleration of homosexuality within musok practitioners.Mudang have sometimes worked in groups. This has been observed among simbang on Jeju, as well as mansin in Seoul. In the early 1990s, for example, a feminist group in Seoul sponsored several mudang to perform a kut ritual for the aggrieved souls of Korean "comfort women." When an arsonist torched Seoul's historic Namdaemun Gate in 2008, several mansin performed a ritual to appease spirits angered by the act.

The tradition maintains that the deities bestow myŏnggi ("divine energy") on a mudang, allowing them to perform their ritual tasks successfully. In musok, divine favor must be gained through purification and supplication, prayer and pilgrimage.
Korean shamans also experience shinmyeong ("divine light"), which is the channeling of a god, during which the shaman speaks prophetically.Shinmyeong is also experienced by entire communities during the kut hold by the shaman, and is a moment of energisation which relieves from social pressure, both physical and mental.

Becoming a mudang

The typical prerequisite for becoming a mudang is to suffer misfortune, with practitioners believing that the deities torment a person with misfortune, illness or madness to alert them to the deities' desire that they become a mudang. This reveals that the supernatural entities have chosen the afflicted person to become their mediator.
They often report fearful encounters with spirits prior to becoming mudang, for instance through dreams; these dreams and visions may reveal which deities the future mudang is expected to serve.
This is termed the sinŭi kamul ("the drought caused by the gods"), or alternatively sinbyŏng ("spirit possession sickness").
One example of sinbyŏng was described by a famous model who became a mudang, Pak Mi-sǒn, who related how her experiences of partial paralysis and hallucinations resulted in her embracing the practice.

A common motif in the biographies of mudang is the claim that they encountered divine beings or spiritual guides while wandering in a wild environment. The mudang may be compelled by spirit voices or visions, or drawn by compulsion to go to a temple, shrine, or sacred mountain. By recounting these stories, mudang legitimate their calling to the profession. Many mudang claim that they never wanted to be one, and fight against the calling.  Most mudang claim that they and their families resisted the calling due to its lowly status and social disapproval.

Once the person has accepted the calling, they must find an established practitioner who is willing to train them. They become this person's apprentice, the chagŭn mudang. Apprentices are usually aged over 18, although there are examples of children becoming apprentices. The apprentice of a mudang may be called their sinttal or sinddal (spirit daughter) if female, or sinadul (spirit son) if male. The mudang will be that novice's sineomeomi. The neophyte must ultimately perform an initiation ritual to open up malmun (the "gates of speech") that will allow them to receive the words of the spirits. This rite is called the naerim kut. It involves the neophyte performing the appropriate chants, dances, and oracles to invoke and convey inspiration from the deities.  If the initiate fails to perform this correctly, with the deities failing to open their malmun, they will have to perform it again. Many mudang will perform multiple naerim kut before being recognised as properly initiated practitioners. Those mudang who have failed to learn how to deal with supernatural entities correctly are sometimes called ōngt'ōri by other practitioners.

Among the hereditary sesŭp-mu tradition, the teachings were not always passed from mother to daughter but sometimes involved the practitioner adopting an apprentice. Thus, sesŭp-mu like the Jeju simbang learn their trade by observing more experienced practitioners. In early 21st-century Jeju, many simbang have been recorded as not wanting their children to follow them into the profession.
When mudang die, their ritual paraphernalia is sometimes burned or buried so as to sever any connection between their deities and their surviving family.

Clients of the mudang

Serving private clients is the core practice for most mudang, even those who have built celebrity status through their performance of staged kut. In Jeju, clients are called tan'gol. Clients seek solutions to their practical problems, typically hoping that the mudang can ascertain the cause of misfortune they have suffered. Common reasons for doing so include recurring nightmares, concerns about a child getting into university, financial woes, business concerns, or physical ailments. Some clients turn to the mudang after being dissatisfied with the diagnosis or treatment administered by medical professionals.
In musok, it is neglecting ancestors and gods that is seen as the primary cause of human affliction. The mudang uses divination and trance visions to determine the source of their client’s trouble. 

Although both sexes are among the clients of mudang, most clientele are women. From his fieldwork in the 1990s, Chongho Kim found that most of the clients were "older women," particularly in their late fifties and early sixties. In that same decade, Kendall noted that most clients in the area of Seoul and its environs were small entrepreneurs, such as owners of small companies, shops, and restaurants. Sarfati noted that in the 21st century, many young people turned to mudang as part of a spiritual search or for counselling. Clients do not generally regard themselves as being committed exclusively to musok, and may primarily visit Buddhist temples or Christian churches. Many mudang themselves believe that their rituals will be pleasing to the spirits regardless of the client's personal beliefs. On occasion, a busy client will not attend the kut they have sponsored.

If the ritual fails to produce the desired result, the client may speculate that it was because of a bad performer, errors in the ritual, the presence of a ritually polluted attendee, or a lack of sincerity on their part. If the client feels the mudang has not successfully solved their problem, they may turn to another mudang. They may be disappointed or angry at this failure given their substantial financial investment; in some rare cases clients have sued mudang. The payment of money is often a source of mistrust between clients and mudang. Concerns about money are heightened by the lack of an "institutional buffer" between the client and ritual practitioner, such as a temple or church.

Altars and shrines

Most musok rituals centre around altars, places for mudang to engage with supernatural beings. If in a client's home, the mudang will often establish a temporary altar. If at a shrine, the altar will often be a stone or an old tree. The mudang will also typically have a shrine in their home in which they host various gods and ancestors. These shrines are called sinbang, harabŏjiŭibang, or pŏptang, and each may have idiosyncratic elements.

This home shrine may include paintings of deities, called musindo, taenghwa, musokhwa, or sinhwa. These paintings are particularly important in the musok traditions of Seoul and of the northwest provinces Hwanghae and P'yǒngan; they were traditionally not found in parts of the south. When included they are usually considered the most important objects present, and hang above the altar. They are regarded as seats for the deities, literally manifesting the latter's presence rather than just visually depicting them, an idea similar to those found across much of Asia, as in Buddhism and Hinduism. As well as being invited to inhabit a painting, a deity may also be petitioned to depart it; they are sometimes believed to leave of their own accord, for instance if they abandon a mudang who keeps the image.Musindo paintings range from being crude to more sophisticated. Traditionally they use colors associated with the five directions (obang saek): red, blue/green, yellow, white, and black. Painters who produce musindo are traditionally expected to adhere to standards of purity while producing these artworks, bathing beforehand and refraining from eating fish or meat. Since the 1970s, musindo have commonly been produced in commercial workshops, although a small number of traditional artists remain in South Korea. After a mudang's death, their musindo were often ritually de-animated and then burned during the 20th century. Some musindo have been donated to museums; certain musok practitioners believe that the deity leaves the image if that occurs.

Also present may be sinsang, or deity statues made of wood, plastic, clay, straw, or metal. Deities may instead be represented by a white piece of paper, the kŭlbal or kŭlmun, onto which the entity's name is written in black or red ink. In musok, the deity may also be seated in physical objects, including stones, clothing, coins, dolls, or knives, and which may be concealed from view, for instance being wrapped within cloth or inside a chest. Some mudang also include images of Buddhist deities on their shrines.

Also present will typically be candlesticks, offering bowls, and incense pots. The home altar will often be dominated with bright, primary colors, in contrast to the muted earth tones which traditionally predominated in Korean daily life. The mudang's altar will also often be a place to store or display their ritual paraphernalia, such as costumes. It may also include toys or dolls to amuse the child gods.Mudang typically bow when entering a shrine-room. Offerings to the deities will be placed on this home shrine. Some offerings, such as cooked rice, fruit, and water, may be changed daily; other offerings, such as sweets, cigarettes, and liquor, may be replaced more infrequently. Mudang hold that they provide offerings to these deities in thanks to the work that these entities have brought them; a large assortment of offerings can thus give the impression that the mudang is financially successful. Worshipping the deities daily sustains their ongoing favor. Clients of the mudang may place offerings at this shrine as well as the mudang themselves.

Deities are often believed to be present in all houses. Historical accounts often reference the presence of earthen jars (tok, hangari, tanji) filled with grain, or smaller baskets or pouches, as offerings to household deities and ancestors. This practice was declining in South Korea by the 1960s and 1970s. By the latter decades of the 20th century, cardboard boxes had become common receptacles for these household offerings.

Kuttang and pugundang

Shrines at which the musok rituals are performed are called kuttang or kut dang (Korean: 굿당) and are typically located on mountains in South Korea. Shrines dedicated to significant tutelary spirits are known as tang or pugundang, and were historically often the foci for local cults, such as those devoted to apotheosised heroes.Kuttang will often be identified on the exterior by the presence of a t'aegŭk symbol, a circular swirl of red, blue, and yellow that symbolises the cosmos.
The main ritual room is called the kut bang, and often contains an offering table on which offerings are placed. Mudang often rent a kuttang to perform their rituals, especially if they do not have the room for such rites in their home.

Some kuttang are regarded as being located at especially auspicious places, at an area below a mountain, the myŏngdang, where positive spiritual energy is thought to congregate. Practitioners often also believe that deities encourage followers to choose specific locales for the placement of kuttang via dreams. Kuttang sometimes move over time. The Kuksadang, which Kendall described as "Seoul's most venerable kuttang", for instance was originally on South Mountain, before being displaced by a Shinto shrine during the Japanese occupation of Korea and then moved onto Inwangsan, a mountain to the north of the city. The growing urbanisation of South Korea since the late 20th century has meant that many are now surrounded by other buildings, sometimes including other kuttang. The increasingly cramped nature of Korean urban living may have encouraged the increasing popularity of kuttang in isolated locations like mountains.
On Jeju Island, various villages have more than one shrine; new village shrines have been established on Jeju during the early 21st century.Kuttang are often run as a business. It is unclear exactly when they began renting themselves out as spaces for mudang to use, although it has been argued that it was in the later years of the Joseon period. The kuttang will have a shrine keeper, who may be a mudang themselves. Other staff based there may include musicians called chaebi, kitchen staff to prepare food for kut rituals, and a maid called the kongyangju who is an intended mudang but who has not yet undergone their initiation ritual. As well as spaces for ritual, these kuttang can also provide places for networking, where mudang can witness the rituals of other practitioners and observe different regional styles.

Kut rites

The central ritual of the mudang is called kut. These are large-scale rites, characterised by rhythmic movements, songs, oracles and prayers. They are the only rituals in traditional Korean religion believed to give supernatural entities the ability to speak directly to humans, and are meant to create welfare, promoting commitment between supernatural beings and humankind. There is regional diversity in the styles of kut, although some mudang mix these different styles, with each kut displaying features unique to its particular circumstances.

A kut is sponsored for a specific purpose. A kut may be arranged due to an illness, domestic quarrel, or financial loss. The purpose of a kut is to get the supernatural beings to communicate, expressing what it is that they want and why they are angry. In the 21st century, it has become increasingly common to sponsor a kut to mark a new financial venture, such as the opening of a mall or an office building.
As well as being performed for clients, the mudang will sometimes perform these rituals for their own personal reasons; in the 1990s, for instance, the prominent mudang Kim Kŭm-hwa performed a kut for Korean reunification.

The fee charged varies between mudang and the circumstances of the rite. However, a kut is usually very expensive for the client of a mudang; based on his fieldwork in 1990s, Chongho Kim noted that a kut in Seoul typically cost between 2 and 5 million won, whereas in the rural area of Soy it cost between 300,000 and 2.5 million won. The precise fee may be negotiated between the mu and their client, sometimes involving haggling. This will usually be agreed at a pre-kut consultation. As well as paying for the mudang's time, the fee also covers the wages of any assistants and the costs of material used in the rite; it may also reflect the years of training they have undertaken to be able to perform these rituals.

The kut is usually held in private, and few have a larger audience than the direct participants, although there are instances where those paying for a kut will invite neighbors to observe. These rituals are typically regarded as unsuitable for children to attend. Often it will take place outdoors and at night, in an isolated rural location, at a kuttang shrine rented for the occasion, or in a private home, either that of the mudang, or that of their client. Setting up the kut may involve not only the mudang but also their apprentices, assistants, musicians, butchers, and cooks. Preparing and decorating the space is deemed a meaningful part of the ritual process, with those setting it up often concerned so as not to offend the spirits.

Colorful paintings of the gods will often be brought into the space where the kut is to be performed; this is not part of the kut performed by Jeju simbang. God paintings are usually paper, although in modern contexts are sometimes polyester, ensuring that they are resistant to rain and tearing. Other practitioners regard the use of polyester images as a corruption of tradition. These images are then often hung on a metal frame. In Taejŏn City and Ch'ungch'ŏng province, a traditional practice involves decorating the ritual space with handmade mulberry paper cut into patterns. Various ritual items may be included in the kut ritual, including swords, the samjichang, a drum, drum stick, and the spirit stick. The samjichang is a three-pronged spear. The chukwonmun is a prayer card used in the kut onto which information like the name of the client may be written. The chukwonmun may then be attached to a drum.

Offerings at the kut

At kut, food is offered to the spirits. This will often include fish, rice, rice cakes, eggs, sweets, biscuits, fruit, and meat. Some of this food will be cooked, some will be offered raw. To provide meat, animal sacrifice occurs at most kut, although is rare in televisual, cinematic, and museum depictions of these rites. A cow or pig killed for the purpose may be butchered in the shrine room; the carcass may be impaled on the trident; if it fails to balance, then this is seen as evidence that the deities do not accept the offering.
When the ritual is intended to invoke Buddhist spirits, the food offerings may be vegetarian; offering these entities meat would offend them. Food offerings may also be set out at the side for wandering spirits who are attracted by the ritual, an act designed to avoid mishaps they could cause.

Offered alongside the food will often be alcoholic drinks, typically soju, as well as non-food items like incense, cloth, money (both real and imitation), and paper flowers. The color of the flowers may indicate to whom they are offered; pink for the spirits of military generals, white for Buddhist deities, and multi-colored for ancestral spirits. The material used for the kut will often be bought in a manmulsang shop, which specialises in traditional religious paraphernalia. In modern South Korea, the ritual paraphernalia used is often of poor quality because it is intended to be burnt following the ceremony.

These may be placed on offering tables; one table will be the halabeoji sang, devoted to the musok gods, while the other table will be the jasang sang, devoted to ancestral spirits. The mudang will often perform divination to determine if the offerings have been accepted by the supernatural beings. It is considered important for the person giving these offerings to do so with sincerity and devotion, with the mudang undertaking a form of divination called "weighing the sincerity" (chŏngsŏng kŭllyang) to determine if this has been the case.

During the ritual, attendees may be expected to give additional offerings of money to the mudang, often while they are possessed, intended as thanks both to them and to the spirits. These offerings, given in addition to the ritual fee, are called pyŏlbi or kajŏn. Any real money presented as offerings to the deities will be taken by the mudang.
Much of the food assembled for the kut will then be distributed and consumed by the attendees at the end of the ritual, having been charged by auspiciousness by its involvement in the rite. Attendees may distribute some of this food to non-attendees once they get home; they may also set some aside to feed any wandering spirits that might have followed them from the kut. In some kut, especially those held at kut dang shrines, food will also be left to decay.

Performance at the kut

The ritual begins with the mudang inviting supernatural entities to the altar, after which they set out to entertain them. Music will often be involved in the kut.
Musical instruments typically involved in kut include cymbals, hourglass-shaped drums called changgu, and a gong. Also sometimes featured is a pipe, the p'iri. The kut will often begin with drumming. The mudang will often dance to the beat of the drums, often swirling in circles, something believed to facilitate the possession trance. They may hold short sticks to which white paper streamers are attached; this device is intended to help channel the spirits into the mudang's body.

The language employed by a mudang during a kut is often deliberately archaic.
The songs or chants of the mudang are called muga. Incantations and ritual words for communicating with the spirit are called chukeon. The mudang will often recite mythological stories during the ritual, something deemed to contribute to its efficacy. These may be recited in full at a longer ritual or in condensed form for a shorter one. There may be breaks during the kut, for instance giving time for the participants to eat.

The mudang may also carry a fan and brass bells; Sarfati commented that these bells were "a central symbol of musok", and their purpose is to attract the attention of the spirits.

The costumes worn for these rituals are called sinbok. These colorful outfits resemble those documented from the 19th and early 20th centuries, and may involve a hanbok. The mansin may distinguish themselves from their assistants by having their hair in the Tchokchin mŏri style.
For the kut, the mudang will dress in the gods' costume, with different deities associated with different items of clothing. They may change outfit over the course of the kut to reflect the different entities possessing them. This is not a practice that the sesup mu engage in.

Also used in many kut are chaktu blades, objects symbolising the bravery of the possessing warrior spirits. The mudang may stab themselves in the chest with the knives, run the blade along their tongue, or press it to their face and hands. Riding knives is termed jakdugeori and involves the mudang walking barefoot on the upturned blade of the knife, sometimes while speaking in gongsu, or possessed speech. Practitioners claim that it is the spirits that prevent the mudang from being cut by the blade, and the ability to undertake such dangerous acts without harm is regarded as evidence for the efficacy of the rite. Some practitioners acknowledge instances in which they have been cut by the blades. Jakdugeori has become an expected part of staged or cinematic kut.

The possession phase takes place at the climax of the ritual. In some kut traditions, the mudang will stand upon an earthen jar while doing so.
The term sin-naerim (descending of the spirits) describes possession of the mansin, intended in a manner that is largely controlled. Possessed speech is called gongsu; words from the possessing entity will then be spoken to the assembled persons by the mudang. Over the course of a kut, a mansin may be possessed by a succession of different supernatural entities.
On Jeju, the simbang will provide a voice for the spirits. Yun noted that the simbang's "so-called medium speech" typically lacked the "dramatic intensity" of the messages conveyed by the kangsin-mu. The entities possessing the mudang will typically dispense advice to the ritual's sponsor and to other attendees.
Supernatural beings will often relate that if a kut had been performed earlier, misfortune would not have befallen the person sponsoring the kut.

The final phase of the kut entails sending off the spirits who have been summoned, often by burning name tags, the josang ot ("clothes for ancestors") or cloth, straw shoes, and imitation money.
Towards the end of the kut, wandering spirits that may have gathered are expelled. Talismans may also be distributed to attendees at the end of the kut.

Styles of kut

The kkonmaji kut or flower-greeting kut is an annual rite held by a mudang to entertain and feed their gods, ancestors, and clients. The sin kut are performed in gratitude to the deities and ancestors for granting a mu their spiritual power and thus a livelihood. They are regarded as returning to these supernatural beings a portion of what the mu has earned. The sin kut can sometimes last 10 days. The byong kut is a ritual for expelling bad spirits, sometimes from a human. This sometimes involves the spirit forcing it into a bottle.

The mich'in kut is performed for a person who is mentally afflicted and often deemed to be possessed by one or more spirits. Exorcisms will often involve throwing scraps of food, sometimes at the afflicted person. The possessing spirit is offered food to encourage it to leave.

Historically, the kut may have had entertainment value when there were few other outlets. Since the latter decades of the 20th century, kut performed primarily for entertainment purposes rather than for religious reasons are referred to as kut gongyeon. Some practitioners who perform both draw a clear distinction between them, although many mudang still regard staged kut as genuine interactions with spirits. Performed in museums or at city festivals, these kut often take place on raised stages surrounded by a seated audience, typically attracting journalists, scholars, and photographers. Staged kut are often dedicated to general causes such as national prosperity; sometimes the food placed as an offering is fake. They often involve folklorists or other scholars who explain the ritual to the audience, while the participants will often be dressed in a common uniform, something not found in private kut. Mudang may see these staged rituals as an opportunity to attract potential new clients, uploading videos of them performing such rites to social media and YouTube.Kut gongyeon are often performed for their artistic value. By 2009, South Korea's government recognised ten regional kut styles as parts of the country's intangible cultural heritage, and that year one of these traditions — the Yǒngdŭng kut performed at Ch'ilmǒri Shrine on Jeju — was added to UNESCO's Representative List of the Intangible Cultural Heritage of Humanity.

Purification
Purity of both the body and the mind is a state that is required for taking part in rituals. Purification is considered necessary for an efficacious communion between living people and ancestral forms. Before any gut is performed, the altar is always purified by fire and water, as part of the first gori of the ritual itself. The colour white, extensively used in rituals, is regarded as a symbol of purity. The purification of the body is performed by burning white paper.

Mountains, landscape, and pilgrimage

In the musok religion, rocks, springs, and sŏn'ang trees may be regarded as being spiritually potent. The latter trees may be marked out by having strips of cloth or paper attached to them.

In stories surrounding the mudang, mountains are often represented as both places of sacred presence and also places associated with the ultimate origin of the mudang tradition. Each prominent mountain is deemed to have a specific mountain spirit who is sovereign upon it. The levels of spiritual power at a mountain are influenced not just by its associated deities but also the ki energy (the equivalent of the Chinese qi) that is present there. This ki is believed to channel through maek ("veins") through the mountain landscape; these can be disrupted by roads or other construction. Thus, the potency of these mountains is thought  to decline amid growing urbanisation and tourist access. In Korea, this traditional geomancy is called p'ungsu, and is akin to the Chinese fengshui.

Pilgrimages to mountain shrines of particular deities have long been part of Korean folk religion. Some mudang prepare for these pilgrimages by abstaining from eating meat, fish, or eggs, and bathe before leaving. On arrival at the shrine, the pilgrim will bow and provide an offering.
Mountain landscapes regularly attract mudang who regard these as places that concentrate powerful deities and which are conducive to receiving visions. They are also seen as places to replenish their "bright energy" (myŏnggi). Mudang will make offerings not only at the mountains but also at springs and guardian trees en route. Incorrectly performing the pilgrimage may upset the sansin and bring about this spirit's retribution.

In historical periods, the mudang's mountain pilgrimages were typically rare events although improved transportation meant that by the 1990s these had become far more regular occurrences in South Korea.
The most sacred mountain for the mudang is Mount Paektu, located on North Korea's northern border with China. This is believed to channel ki to every other mountain in the peninsula. According to legend, it is also the birthplace of Tan'gun, the national ancestor and first mudang. Since the 1990s, mudang from South Korea have travelled to China to make pilgrimages to this mountain.

Talismans and divination
An important component of the mudang's role is to produce talismans called pujŏk (bujeok) which are presented as providing the bearer with good fortune. These pujŏk are often based on hancha, Korean versions of Chinese ideograms. These may be distributed to attendees at the end of a rite. Clients will often affix these to the internal walls of their home.

Divination is termed jeom. One form of divination, sometimes performed during other rituals, involves a person picking one of a selection of rolled up silk flags. The color of the selected flag is then interpreted as bearing meaning for that individual. Green and yellow flags are for instance often seek as indicating bad fortune, while red is regarded as being auspicious.
The mugŏri style of divination involves casting rice and coins onto a tray.

In Korean vernacular religion, there are also ritual specialists who perform divinations and produce amulets but who do not engage in kut rituals like the mudang.

History

Detailed accounts of mudang rituals prior to the modern period are rare, and the fact that the tradition is orally transmitted means it is difficult to trace historical processes.

Prehistory

Korean shamanism goes back to prehistoric times, pre-dating the introduction of Buddhism and Confucianism, and the influence of Taoism, in Korea. Vestiges of temples dedicated to gods and spirits have been found on tops and slopes of many mountains in the peninsula.

Shamanism can be traced back to 1,000 BC. The religion has been part of the culture of the Korean Peninsula since then. “Historically, Korean Shamanism (Musok) was an orally transmitted tradition that was mastered mainly by illiterate low-ranking women within the neo-Confucian hierarchy.” However, several records and texts have documented the origin of Korean Shamanism. One of these texts is Wei Shi which traces Shamanism to the third century. Chinese dynastic histories mention the importance of designated shamans among early religious practices in Japan but not Korea. The Korean studies scholar Richard D. McBride thus asserts that non-shamans were able to practice "under their own authority". Evidently, the history of Korean Shamanism remains a mystery. However, foreign religions, including Christianity, Buddhism, Confucianism and Taoism have influenced the development of Korean Shamanism.

The development of Korean Shamanism can be categorized into different groups. The first category involves simple transformation. In this transformation, the influence of the practices and beliefs of other religions on Korean Shamanism was superficial. The second category of transmission was syncretistic. This category involves Shamanism being incorporated into the practices and beliefs of other cultures, including Confucianism, Christianity, Taoism, and Buddhism. These religions had different levels of influence on Korean Shamanism. The third category involves the formation of new religions through the mixing of beliefs and practices of Shamanism with those of other dominant religions.

Although many Koreans converted to Buddhism when it was introduced to the peninsula in the 4th century, and adopted as the state religion in Silla and Goryeo, it remained a minor religion compared to Korean shamanism.

The term mu is first recorded in the 12th-century Yisanggugjip. It also appears in the Samguk Sagi from that century.
The use of images of the musok deities, hanging on the wall, is first recorded from the 13th century.

Joseon Korea and Japanese Occupation

The Goryeo kingdom was replaced by the Joseon dynasty, which saw an increase in governmental persecution of the mudang, who were seen as having a low status. Confucianism was the dominant ideology in Joseon Korea, contributing to these suppressions; later historians argued that this was connected to the elite's desire to gain more power by challenging rivals to their Confucian system. Confucians accepted the existence of the spirits invoked in the mudang's rites, but argued that there were better ways of dealing with these supernatural beings. They regarded the musok rituals as improper, criticising the presence of both sexes together in environments where alcohol was being consumed. Korea's Neo-Confucian scholars used the derogatory term ŭmsa for non-Confucian ceremonies, of which they considered the mudang rituals among the lowest.

In the Joseon dynasty, mudang belonged to one of eight outcast groups that were expelled from the capital city. The Gyeonggukdaejeon law book prescribed 100 lashes in public for anyone found to be supporting them. This persecution could prove deadly; in an extreme case, a mudang was beheaded in 1398. In an oft-cited incident, Jeju governor Yi Hyǒngsang initiated a purge of simbang  on the island in 1702, destroying 129 shrines. Taxes were levied on the mudang's rituals, both to discourage the practice but also to raise revenues for the government; these taxes remained in place until the 1895 Kabo reforms. At the same time as the government persecuted the mudang, they also turned to them in emergencies like epidemics, droughts, and famines.

By the late 19th century, many Korean intellectuals eager for modernisation came to regard musok as superstition that should be eradicated; they increasingly referred to it with the term misin ("superstition"). These ideas were endorsed in the Independent, Korea's first vernacular newspaper. Many of these intellectuals were Christian, thus regarding the mudang's spirits as evil demons. In 1896, police launched a crackdown by arresting mudang, destroying shrines, and burning paraphernalia.

The Japanese Empire invaded Korea in 1910. During the Japanese occupation, the occupiers tried to incorporate musok within, or replace it with, State Shinto. The Japanese colonial Governor-General of Chōsen presented the mudang as evidence for Korean cultural backwardness, an approach intended to legitimate Japanese imperial rule. Japanese efforts to suppress the tradition included the Mind Cultivation Movement launched in 1936. Korean elites largely supported these suppressions, hoping to prove Korean cultural advancement to the Japanese overlords.

It was in this colonial context that scholars developed the idea that the mudang were continuing an ancient Korean religion and thus represented the spiritual and cultural repository of the Korean people. Influenced by the Western use of the term "shamanism" as a cross-cultural category, some Korean scholars speculated that the mudang tradition descended from Siberian traditions. The Japanese scholar Torii Ryūzō proposed the mudang as a remnant of a primordial Shinto, with both stemming from Siberian "shamanism." These ideas were built on by nationalist Korean scholars Ch'oe Nam-sŏn and Yi Nŭnghwa in the 1920s. Cho'e reversed Torii's framework by emphasising the primacy of ancient Korean over Japanese tradition as the transmitter of Siberian religion, while Yi promoted the mudang tradition as the residue of what he called sin'gyo ("divine teachings"), meaning a primordial Korean religion that lost its purity through the arrival of Confucianism and Buddhism. At the time, Korean elites remained wary about this new positive reassessment.

Korean War and Division

The situation for Musok worsened after the division of Korea and the establishment of a northern Socialist government and a southern pro-Christian government. The Korean War and subsequent urbanisation of Korean society resulted in many Koreans moving around the peninsula, impacting the distinct regional traditions of the mudang. Many mudang from Hwanghae (in North Korea) resettled in Inchon (in South Korea), strongly influencing musok there, for example. This migration meant that by the early 21st century, kangsin-mu were increasingly dominant in areas like Jeju where sesŭp-mu historically predominated, generating rivalry between the two traditions.

In North Korea, most formal religious activity was suppressed. Mudang and their families were targeted as members of the "hostile class" and were considered to have bad songbun, "tainted blood". In South Korea, Christianity spread rapidly from the 1960s onward, becoming the country's dominant religion by the start of the 21st century. South Korean leader Rhee Syngman launched the Sin Saenhwal Undong (New Life Movement) which destroyed many village shrines. This policy continued as the Saemaul Undong ("New Community Movement") of his successor, Park Chung-hee, which led to a surge in the police suppression of mudang during the 1970s. Such outright persecution ended after Park's assassination in 1979.

The popularisation of folklore studies in the 1970s resulted in the notion of musok as Korea's ancient tradition gaining acceptance among growing numbers of educated South Koreans. In 1962, South Korea had introduced a Cultural Properties Protection Law that recognised performing arts as intangible cultural heritage; some folklorists used this to help defend the mudang. In the latter part of the 20th century, the mudang rituals were increasingly revived as a form of theatrical performance linked to cultural conservation and tourism.  From the 1980s onward, South Korea's government designated certain mudang as Human Cultural Treasures. One of the best-known examples was Kim Geum-hwa (Kim Kŭm-hwa), who from the 1980s performed for foreign anthropologists, toured Western countries, and appeared in documentaries. Reflecting the view of musok as an important part of Korea's cultural heritage, a kut was depicted on a South Korean postage stamp while musok elements were included at the Seoul 1988 Olympic Arts Festival and the 1988 inauguration of President Roh Tae-woo. Paintings of musok deities became increasingly collectable in the 1980s and 1990s.

The mudang were often regarded favorably within South Korea's minjung (Popular Culture Movement) pro-democracy campaign from the 1970s; several mudang were active in the movement and became emblematic of its struggle. Advocacy groups were also formed to advance the cause of the mu, keen to present the tradition as lying at the heart of Korean culture, while the 1980s also saw mudang begin to write books about themselves. Mudang also adapted to new technologies; from the 1990s they increasingly used the Internet to advertise their services, while portrayals of mudang became widespread on South Korean television in the 2010s. This increasing cultural visibility improved the mudang's social image.

Since the early 19th century, a number of movements of revitalisation or innovation of traditional Korean shamanism arose. They are characterised by an organised structure, a codified doctrine, and a body of scriptural texts. They may be grouped into three major families: the family of Daejongism or Dangunism, the Donghak-originated movements (including Cheondoism and Suunism), and the family of Jeungsanism (including Jeungsando, Daesun Jinrihoe, the now-extinct Bocheonism, and many other sects).

DemographicsMudang have conventionally belonged to the lowest social class. Chongho Kim noted that most mudang he encountered in the 1990s had a "very poor educational background", and were also typically financially poor. Most mudang are female, with the religion being dominated by women. This may connect to origin myths that present musok as first developing among priestesses. Chongho Kim cautioned that the notion of musok being a "women's religion" ignored the antagonistic attitude that most Korean women had towards it. Approximately a fifth of mudang are male paksu, although the latter are proportionately over-represented in 21st-century media representations. There is regional variation in these gender differences; on Jeju Island, there were more male than female simbang prior to the 1950s, and proportions of male practitioners remain higher there than on the Korean mainland.

Determining the number of mudang is difficult. In the early 21st century, Sarfati noted that the number of mudang was estimated at being over 200,000, a number that she observed was "not diminishing". This stability is not evenly distributed among different types of mudang; in 2019, Yung noted that the hereditary sesŭp-mu, including the Jeju simbang, were "in steep decline". There is also regional variation in the presence of mudang; by the 21st century, mudang were more common in Seoul than in rural parts of South Korea, while Yun observed that the practice was "undeniably more prominent" on Jeju than on the mainland. Musok is not recorded in the South Korean census because the government does not regard adherence to it as being akin to identifying as a Christian or a Buddhist. A late 20th-century survey by the Korean Gallup Research Institute indicated that 38 percent of the adult population of South Korea had used a mudang.
In North Korea, according to demographic analyses by Religious Intelligence, approximately 16 percent of the population practises "traditional ethnic" religion.

Since at least the 20th century, mudang have travelled abroad to perform rituals; many for instance travel to Japan to serve clients in Japan's Korean minority. There are also mudang living in Europe, and a small number of non-Koreans have become mudang; a 2007 documentary covered the story of a German mudang. Kendall noted the existence of one mudang living outside Korea who was promoting their teachings through New Age-style workshops.

ReceptionMusok has been suppressed throughout Korean history under a succession of dominant ideologies including Confucianism, Japanese colonialism, and Christianity. At the start of the 21st century, the mudang remained widely stigmatized in South Korean society, facing widespread prejudice. In 2021, Sarfati observed that while the religion was "still stigmatized," it was experiencing "growing acceptance" in South Korea.

The religion's critics often regard mudang as swindlers, people who manipulate the gullible. Critics regularly focus their critique on the large sums of money that the mudang charge, and maintain that the expenses required for its rituals are wasteful. Critics have also accused mudang of disrupting the civil order with their rituals.
Kendall noted that there was a "generally adversarial relationship" between mudang and Protestants in South Korea, the latter regarding musok as "Devil worship". Mainline Protestant theologians have sometimes blamed musok for predisposing Koreans to Pentecostalism and the idea that prayer can generate financial reward. Christians have sometimes harassed mudang at their places of work or during their ceremonies, something which some mudang regard as religious discrimination.Mudang began appearing in South Korean film in the 1960s. Early portrayals in the 1960s and 1970s generally showed them as harmful, frightening, and anti-modern figures, as in Ssal (1963), Munyŏdo (1972) and Iŏdo (1977). From the mid-2000s, films increasingly portrayed them as members of a living tradition situated in modern urban environments, as in Ch'ŏngham Posal (2009) and Paksu Kŏndal (2013). The 2000s also saw several successful documentaries about mudang appear in Korean cinemas, as well as increasing appearances of mudang on Korean television. Korean artists who have cited musok rituals as an influence on their work include Nam June Paik, who recreated an exorcism kut for several performances from the late 1970s. Musok has also been presented in museums, although often with emphasis placed on its folkloric and aesthetic value rather than its role as a religious practice.  South Korea's government often embrace kut as a traditional performing artform, but marginalise its religious function.Musok has influenced some Korean new religions, such as Cheondoism and Jeungsanism, and some Christian churches in Korea make use of practices rooted in musok.

See also

 Gasin faith
 Korean folklore
 Korean numismatic charm
 Korean traditional festivals
 Jongmyo jerye
 Religion in Korea
 Samgong bon-puri
 Taoism in Korea

Footnotes

References
Citations

Sources

 

 

Further reading

English language sources
 
 
 Keith Howard (Hrsg.): Korean Shamanism. Revival, survivals and change. The Royal Asiatic Society, Korea Branch, Seoul Press, Seoul 1998.
 Dong Kyu Kim: Looping effects between images and realities: understanding the plurality of Korean shamanism. The University of British Columbia, 2012.
 Laurel Kendall: Shamans, housewives and other restless spirits. Woman in Korean ritual life (= Studies of the East Asien Institute.). University of Hawaii Press, Honolulu 1985.
 Kwang-Ok Kim: Rituals of resistance. The manipulation of shamanism in contemporary Korea. In: Charles F. Keyes; Laurel Kendall; Helen Hardacre (Hrsg.): Asian visions of authority. Religion and the modern states of East and Southeast Asia. University of Hawaii Press, Honolulu 1994, S. 195–219.
 
 Daniel Kister: Korean shamanist ritual. Symbols and dramas of transformation. Akadémiai Kiadó, Budapest 1997.
 Dirk Schlottmann: Cyber Shamanism in South Korea. Online Publication: Institut of Cyber Society. Kyung Hee Cyber University, Seoul 2014.
 Dirk Schlottmann Spirit Possession in Korean Shaman rituals of the Hwanghaedo-Tradition.In: Journal for the Study of Religious Experiences. Vol.4 No.2. The Religious Experience Research Centre (RERC) at the University of Wales Trinity Saint David, Wales 2018.
 Dirk Schlottmann Dealing with Uncertainty: “Hell Joseon” and the Korean Shaman rituals for happiness and against misfortune. In: Shaman – Journal of the International Society for Academic Research on Shamanism.'' Vol. 27. no 1 & 2, p. 65–95. Budapest: Molnar & Kelemen Oriental Publishers 2019.

Korean language sources
 
 
 
 
 
 

 
 
 
 
 

 
East Asian religions